The second season of the American science fiction television series Star Trek: Enterprise commenced airing on UPN in the United States on September 18, 2002 and concluded on May 21, 2003 after 26 episodes. Set in the 22nd century, the series follows the adventures of the first Starfleet starship Enterprise, registration NX-01. The second season saw the series continue a concentration on stand-alone episodes as seen in the debut season, but the decision was made to start an ongoing story-arc to run into the third season with the second season finale episode "The Expanse". The second season also saw the return of executive producer Rick Berman to writing duties after he had been working on the film Star Trek: Nemesis.

The season continued the Temporal Cold War story-arc with the opening episode "Shockwave" (part two), and the producers sought to include further appearances by the Andorians and the Vulcans. It also introduced the Romulans in their earliest appearance in the Star Trek timeline with the episode "Minefield", and the Borg made an appearance in the series in "Regeneration". Berman and Brannon Braga sought to bring Patrick Stewart in to direct an episode of Enterprise, and it was also suggested that either he or Whoopi Goldberg could appear on-screen as their Star Trek: The Next Generation characters. Berman also said he was open to an appearance by William Shatner.

According to the Nielsen Ratings received for the episodes, the season stayed steady above four percent with the exception of two dips below that level. One of these dips included the episode "Horizon", which with its 2.2 percent rating, was the lowest viewed episode of the series at that point. The critical reception to the second season was mixed, with one reviewer stating that the series did not learn from the mistakes of the first season and another calling it childish for the lack of consequences being seen in the episodes. However, the introduction of the ongoing story-line in the season finale was met with praise. The series was nominated for five Emmy Awards, four Saturn Awards and two Hugo Awards but did not win in any categories.

Plot overview
The second season continues the Human exploration of interstellar space by the crew of Enterprise, and further mention is made of the Temporal Cold War. The early encounters and historic culture of familiar Star Trek franchise races, such as the Vulcans, Andorians, Klingons, Romulans, Tholians, Borg, and Tellarites, are also explored further. The season ends with a cliffhanger that sets up the Xindi story arc, set in the Delphic Expanse, of the third season.

Cast

Main cast

Recurring cast

Episodes 

In the following table, episodes are listed by the order in which they aired.

Production
Production on the second season of Enterprise began on June 24, 2002, on a location shoot for the second episode of the season, "Carbon Creek". Once production on that episode was complete, the crew moved onto the second part of "Shockwave", which would be broadcast first. It was produced in that order as "Carbon Creek" only required Scott Bakula, Connor Trinneer and Jolene Blalock from the main cast to appear. The remaining cast returned on July 10, for the first day of production for the second half of "Shockwave".

Executive producer Rick Berman was looking forward to resuming writing with Brannon Braga on episodes of Enterprise as he had been previously busy with work on the film Star Trek: Nemesis. He was also in talks to bring Patrick Stewart in to direct an episode of the series, saying that the pair had discussed this and Stewart was interested but was busy at the time filming X2 in Canada. He added that once Stewart had a few weeks spare in his schedule, that they would see if he could be brought in to direct an episode. 

Two other Star Trek alumni returned to Enterprise to direct. These were Roxann Dawson and LeVar Burton. Dawson had previously played B'Elanna Torres on Star Trek: Voyager, and had directed the episodes "The Andorian Incident" and "Vox Sola" during the first season of Enterprise as well as two episodes of Voyager. She said that after a season of working together, the cast of Enterprise were finding their characters "beautifully". 

Burton had played Geordi La Forge in Star Trek: The Next Generation, before moving into directing with the 100th episode of Voyager, "Timeless". He had directed two episodes of Enterprise during the first season, and filmed a further two during the second season including "First Flight". This episode was the 50th episode of the series and featured guest appearances from three members of the crew of the United States Navy aircraft carrier USS Enterprise (CVN-65).

There were several links in promotion between Star Trek: Nemesis and Enterprise, as season two saw Enterprise form half of a two-hour block called "Out of This World Wednesdays on UPN", with a new series of The Twilight Zone forming the second half. This promotion had a Nemesis competition tied into it, offering the chance for five winners to take a trip to Los Angeles to attend the premiere of the film. Another competition linked Nemesis back to Enterprise, with participating Loews Cinemas offering the chance to win a walk-on role on the series.

Themes
Brannon Braga said that the production team sought to increase the tempo of season two compared to the first season. He said at a press junket held by the Television Critics Association in July 2002 that "We're just starting. We want to capitalise more on the fact that [Enterprise] is a sequel. We want to have a season that maybe has more action in it than it had last season." He predicted that possible storylines would include Jonathan Archer fulfilling more of his potential as Captain of the Enterprise, as well as further instalments in the Temporal Cold War story-arc and further interactions between the crew and both the Andorians and the Vulcans.

Braga said that they wanted to avoid overloading the Temporal Cold War but instead they wanted to create an ongoing element to the series during season two. He expected that it would feature in the first episode of the season, "Shockwave" (part two), but then there would be a break before it was featured again. He also revealed that the recurring character of Daniels wasn't entirely human, and that this would be revealed during the second season while at a panel discussion at the Official Star Trek Convention in Las Vegas in August 2002. Berman, said that the revelation of who was controlling the Suliban would not be shown during the second season, but he promised a "really good" season and was open to William Shatner appearing in the show. Scott Bakula also referred to a previous discussion with Berman where the producer suggested that Patrick Stewart or Whoopi Goldberg could appear on-screen in the second season through the means of time travel from their time on Star Trek: The Next Generation.

Perhaps the biggest announcement made prior to the start of the season was the return of the Romulans to Star Trek. They had not previously been seen on Enterprise, and Braga was well aware that they would have to carefully consider the continuity as the crew of James T. Kirk's Enterprise were the first to see a Romulan in the episode "Balance of Terror". He said "The continuity is airtight. Believe me. We know. We know...". The species were due to make their first appearance in the Star Trek timeline in the episode "Minefield", which was written by former The X-Files writer John Shiban. At the same time that the Romulans were due to appear in Enterprise, work was underway on the Romulan-centric film, Star Trek: Nemesis. The second season also saw an appearance by the Borg in the episode "Regeneration", which was intended to follow up on the events in Star Trek: First Contact.

Reception

Ratings
The season opened with Nielsen ratings of 4.9/8 percent for "Shockwave" (part two). This means that it was seen by 4.9 percent of all 18- to 49-year-olds, and 8 percent of all 18- to 49-year-olds watching television at the time of the broadcast. The ratings received for the season rose over the next few episodes to 5.4/8 percent for "Dead Stop" - the most watched episode of the season. "Vanishing Point" was the first episode of the season to drop below a 4 percent rating, but not the last as "Judgment", "The Breach" and "Horizon" also received ratings below the season average. The ratings received by "Horizon" of 2.2 percent were a series low at that point. But the ratings increased following that trio of episodes, and the season ended with "The Expanse" receiving ratings of 4.4/7 percent. Overall, season 2 was part of the show's long-term decline in ratings, with both the last episode to be seen by more than 5 million people and the first to be seen by fewer than 4 million.

Critical response
At the time of the broadcast of the final episode of the season, Scott D. Pierce for the Deseret News described Enterprise as not "an awful show, it's just, well, boring." He called the new story arc introduced in "The Expanse" a "promising idea". But also added, "it's pretty hard to get your hopes up too high for Enterprise."

Randy Miller III, in his review of the Blu-ray release of the second season for DVD Talk, said that the memory of this season was worse than it actually was. He criticised the studio's instance at stand-alone episodes but said that there was a marked improvement about halfway through the season, calling the finale "game-changing". He added that at the time of the DVD release, he did not feel so positively towards the season and agreed with Holly Ordway's opinion at the time. Ordway had said that the second season sought to be more realistic, but that it feels childish as no one gets hurt or killed - even in the episode "Marauders" which saw a group of colonists defend themselves from renegade Klingons. She called the finale a "giant reset button" on the series, adding that it seemed that the show was about to become a sequel to Voyager but squandering the premise it had been given. 

Michael Simpson, while writing for SciFiNow, suggested that the second season of Enterprise "suggests a fatal failure to recognise what went wrong" with the first season. He said that the inclusion of the Borg in the episode "Regeneration" lacked fresh ideas as a similar idea had previously appeared in season one with the Ferengi making first contact but not being named in "Acquisition". He was frustrated with the season due to the "unfulfilled potential", and praised episodes such as "Carbon Creek", "Singularity" and "Cogenitor". James Hunt at the website Den of Geek placed three second season episodes in his top ten list of Enterprise. In ninth place, "First Flight" was chosen as it demonstrated that Jonathan Archer was "the most Kirk-esque Captain since the original". "Regeneration" was placed in third position, while "Carbon Creek" was the runner-up for the best episode because it was an early episode in which the series found its feet.

In 2019, CBR rated Season 2 of Star Trek: Enterprise as the 14th best season of all Star Trek seasons up to that time.

Awards
Enterprise received five nominations in three categories at the 55th Primetime Emmy Awards. Three of these were in the "Outstanding Special Visual Effects For A Series" category; "Dead Stop", "The Crossing" and "The Expanse". The series had won that category at the 54th Emmy Awards, for the pilot "Broken Bow". Michael Westmore's team was nominated for "Outstanding Makeup For A Series (Prosthetic)" for their work on the episode "Canamar" and Dennis McCarthy musical score for "The Expanse" was nominated for "Outstanding Music Composition For A Series (Dramatic Underscore)".

Both "Carbon Creek" and "A Night in Sickbay" were nominated at the 2003 Hugo Awards for "Best Dramatic Presentation, Short Form", but lost to "Conversations with Dead People" - an episode of Buffy the Vampire Slayer. At the 29th Saturn Awards, the series was nominated for "Best Network Television Series" and Scott Bakula, Joelene Blalock and Connor Trinneer were nominated for "Best Actor on Television", "Best Supporting Actress on Television" and "Best Supporting Actor on Television", respectively. However, the series did not win any of the awards it was nominated for.

Media information
As part of the releases of Enterprise on Blu-ray announced in early 2013, a box set featuring the episodes of the second season was released on August 19 in the United Kingdom and a day later in the United States and Canada.

Notes

References

External links

 Season 2 on Memory Alpha
 Season guide on IMDb

2001 American television seasons
2002 American television seasons
Star Trek: Enterprise
Enterprise